Riccardo Staglianò (born 1968 in Viareggio) is an author and reporter for the Italian newspaper La Repubblica.

Staglianò has been writing for another Italian newspaper, Corriere della Sera, about new technologies. He is a co-founder of the on-line cultural magazine Caffè Europa. In New York, he has been a correspondent for the monthly magazine Reset.

Since 2002 he has been teaching theory and technology of the new media and online journalism (Giornalismo On line) in the Third University of Rome.

In 2000, for the Italian publishing house Feltrinelli, he wrote Bill Gates: An Unauthorized Biography (Bill Gates, una biografia non autorizzata).

References

External links
Caffè Europa website 
La Repubblica website
 
Italian interview to Riccardo Staglianò on HTML portal by Andrea Spila, 19 December 2001 Writing on the web an interview to Riccardo Staglianò ;

1968 births
Living people
People from Viareggio
Italian journalists
Italian male journalists
Italian male writers